Devils Peak (or Mount Diablo or Diablo Peak) at  is the tallest peak on the Channel Islands of California. It is located on Santa Cruz Island within Channel Islands National Park on land owned by The Nature Conservancy. Visiting the area requires a permit.

Devil's Peak is the highest mountain on an ocean island in the contiguous 48 states, edging out Mount Constitution on Orcas Island by a few feet.

References

External links
 
 

Channel Islands National Park
Landforms of the Channel Islands of California
Mountains of Santa Barbara County, California
Mountains of Southern California